Anne Carson  (born June 21, 1950) is a Canadian poet, essayist, translator, classicist, and professor.

Trained at the University of Toronto, Carson has taught classics, comparative literature, and creative writing at universities across the United States and Canada since 1979, including McGill, Michigan, NYU, and Princeton.

With more than twenty books of writings and translations published to date, Carson was awarded Guggenheim and MacArthur Fellowships, has won the Lannan Literary Award, two Griffin Poetry Prizes, the T. S. Eliot Prize, the Princess of Asturias Award, the Governor General's Award for English-language poetry and the PEN/Nabokov Award, and was appointed a Member of the Order of Canada in 2005 for her contribution to Canadian letters.

Life and work

Early life
Anne Carson was born in Toronto on June 21, 1950. Her father was a banker and she grew up in a number of small Canadian towns.

Education
In high school, a Latin instructor introduced Carson to the world and language of Ancient Greece and tutored her privately. Enrolling at St. Michael's College at the University of Toronto, she left twice—at the end of her first and second years. Carson, disconcerted by curricular constraints (particularly by a required course on Milton), retired to the world of graphic arts for a short time. She did eventually return to the University of Toronto where she completed her B.A. in 1974, her M.A. in 1975, and her Ph.D. in 1981. She also spent a year studying Greek metrics and Greek textual criticism at the University of St Andrews.

Writing
Trained as a classicist, and with an interest in comparative literature, anthropology, history, and the arts, Carson fuses ideas and themes from many fields in her writing. She frequently references, modernises, and translates Ancient Greek and Latin literature – writers such as Aeschylus, Catullus, Euripides, Homer, Ibycus, Mimnermus, Sappho, Simonides, Sophocles, Stesichorus, and Thucydides. She is also influenced by, and references more modern writers and thinkers, such as Emily Brontë, Paul Celan, Emily Dickinson, Georg Wilhelm Friedrich Hegel, Friedrich Hölderlin, Franz Kafka, John Keats, Gertrude Stein, Simone Weil, and Virginia Woolf. Many of her books blend the forms of poetry, essay, prose, criticism, translation, dramatic dialogue, fiction, and non-fiction to varying degrees.

First editions of Carson's eighteen books of writings (as of 2021) have been published by Alfred A. Knopf, New Directions, and the Princeton University Press in the US, by Brick Books and McClelland & Stewart in Canada, and by Bloodaxe Books, Jonathan Cape, Oberon Books, and Sylph Editions in the UK.

Works
Eros the Bittersweet – Carson's first book of criticism, published in 1986 – examines eros as a simultaneous experience of pleasure and pain best exemplified by "glukupikron", a word of Sappho's creation and the "bittersweet" of the book's title. It considers how triangulations of desire appear in the writings of Sappho, ancient Greek novelists, and Plato. A reworking of her 1981 doctoral thesis Odi et Amo Ergo Sum ("I Hate and I Love, Therefore I Am"), Eros the Bittersweet "laid the groundwork for her subsequent publications, […] formulating the ideas on desire that would come to dominate her poetic output", and establishing her "style of patterning her writings after classical Greek literature".

Men in the Off Hours (2000) is a hybrid collection of short poems, verse essays, epitaphs, commemorative prose, interviews, scripts, and translations from ancient Greek and Latin (of Alcman, Catullus, Sappho and others). The book broke with Carson's established pattern of writing long poems. The pieces include diverse references to writers, thinkers, and artists, as well as to historical, biblical, and mythological figures, including: Anna Akhmatova, Antigone, Antonin Artaud, John James Audubon, Augustine, Bei Dao, Catherine Deneuve, Emily Dickinson, Tamiki Hara, Hokusai, Edward Hopper, Longinus (both biblical and literary), Thucydides, Leo Tolstoy, and Virginia Woolf.

Carson delivered a series of "short talks", or short-format poems on various subjects, at the address to the University of Toronto Ph.D. graduating class of 2012. She also participated in the Bush Theatre's project Sixty Six Books in 2011, writing a piece titled "Jude: The Goat at Midnight" based on the Epistle of Jude from the King James Bible.

Reception
Carson's first book of poetry – 1984's Canicula di Anna – garnered her first literary prize: the Quarterly Review of Literature Betty Colladay Award. Acclaim for her first book of essays, Eros the Bittersweet, grew in the fifteen years after it was published in 1986: the book "first stunned the classics community as a work of Greek scholarship; then it stunned the nonfiction community as an inspired return to the lyrically based essays once produced by Seneca, Montaigne, and Emerson; and then, and only then, deep into the 1990s, reissued as 'literature' and redesigned for an entirely new audience, it finally stunned the poets." By the turn of the millennium, Eros the Bittersweet had also entered into the popular consciousness, voted onto the 1999 Modern Library Reader's List for the 100 Best Nonfiction books of the 20th century, and mentioned (along with Autobiography of Red) in a 2004 episode of the television series The L Word.

Early recognition for her work also came from the Quebec Writers' Federation Awards (known as "QSPELL" until 1998), which shortlisted Carson for Short Talks in 1993 before going on to award her the honour three times between 1996 and 2001 (for Glass, Irony, and God, Autobiography of Red, and The Beauty of the Husband). Carson's early publications saw her shortlisted for the 1994 Journey Prize for "Water Margins", and brought her the 1996 Lannan Literary Award for Poetry, and the 1997 Pushcart Prize for her poem "Jaget". In 1997, Carson was awarded a Rockefeller Bellagio Center Fellowship, followed by a Guggenheim Fellowship for Poetry in 1998, and a MacArthur Fellowship (commonly known as the "Genius Grant") in 2000.

The National Book Critics Circle Award shortlisted Carson three times (for Autobiography of Red in 1998, Men in the Off Hours in 2000, and Nox in 2010), making her and Alice Munro the first two non-Americans to be nominated after the Award went global in 1998. She was also shortlisted for the Forward Prize in 1998 for Glass and God, her first book of poetry published in the UK. Shortlisted for the T. S. Eliot Prize four times between 1999 and 2013, Carson won for The Beauty of the Husband in 2001 (her third consecutive nomination), making her the first woman to be awarded this honour. Carson was the first poet to be awarded the Griffin Poetry Prize (for Men in the Off Hours in 2001), and the first to win the prize for a second time (for Red Doc> in 2013). She was also a judge for the 2010 Griffin Poetry Prize.

Carson was appointed a Member of the Order of Canada in 2005, the announcement describing her as "a singular voice in the literature of our country". She was awarded an honorary degree by her alma mater, the University of Toronto, in 2012. She also received an honorary degree of Doctor of Letters in 2014 from the University of St Andrews, where she studied for a diploma with Kenneth Dover in 1975–1976.

In 2018, Carson was longlisted for the one-time New Academy Prize in Literature, established as an alternative to the postponed 2018 Nobel Prize. In 2020, she was awarded the Princess of Asturias Award for Literature, with the jury noting that she "has attained levels of intensity and intellectual standing that place her among the most outstanding of present-day writers". In 2021, Carson won the PEN/Nabokov Award for Achievement in International Literature, honouring a body of work marked by "enduring originality and consummate craftsmanship", and received the 2020 Governor General's Award for English-language poetry for Norma Jeane Baker of Troy, an award she was first shortlisted for in 2001 (for Men in the Off Hours).

Carson has been the subject of two edited volumes: Anne Carson: Ecstatic Lyre, edited by Joshua Marie Wilkinson and published by the University of Michigan Press in 2015, which is dedicated to the breadth of her works; and Anne Carson/ Antiquity (sic), edited by Laura Jansen and published by Bloomsbury in 2021, which examines Carson's classicism as it emerges in her poetry, translations, essays, and visual artistry.

In recent years, Carson has been regarded as a likely candidate for the Nobel Prize in Literature, alongside such writers as Margaret Atwood, Maryse Condé, Haruki Murakami, Ngũgĩ wa Thiong'o, Lyudmila Ulitskaya, and Can Xue.

Translation
Carson has published translations of ten ancient Greek tragedies – one by Aeschylus (Agamemnon), two by Sophocles (Antigone, Electra), and seven by Euripides (Alcestis, Hecuba, Herakles, Hippolytus, Iphigenia in Tauris, Orestes, and The Bacchae) – as well as the poetry of Sappho in English.

First editions of Carson's seven books of translations have been published by Alfred A. Knopf, Farrar, Straus and Giroux, the New York Review of Books, and the University of Chicago Press in the US, and by Oberon Books and the Oxford University Press in the UK.

Carson was a Rockefeller Scholar-in-Residence at the 92nd Street Y (New York City) from August 1986 to August 1987, where she worked on a translation of Sophocles' Electra. It was eventually published in 2001 and included in her 2009 book An Oresteia, which won the PEN Award for Poetry in Translation in 2010. Featuring Aeschylus' Agamemnon, Sophocles' Electra, and Euripides' Orestes, An Oresteia was staged in New York by the Classic Stage Company in 2009.

Carson was also an Anna-Maria Kellen Fellow at the American Academy in Berlin in 2007, where she worked on a translation of the ancient Greek play Prometheus Bound (attributed to Aeschylus), an excerpt of which was published in 2010.

In 2015, a production of Carson's Antigone directed by Ivo van Hove and starring Juliette Binoche opened at Les Théâtres de la Ville de Luxembourg in 2015 before travelling to cities in Europe and the US, including London (Barbican Centre), New York (BAM), and Paris (Théâtre de la Ville).

Teaching
Carson began her Classics teaching career at the University of Calgary in 1979, before completing her Ph.D. at the University of Toronto. In 1980, she joined Princeton University, where she taught as instructor, and later assistant professor. She also taught at the 92nd Street Y in New York during her time there as a Rockefeller Scholar in Residence (1986–1987). Failing to make tenure, Carson left Princeton in 1987 to teach classical languages and literature at Emory University in Atlanta for a year, before moving to Montreal to join McGill University as Director of Graduate Studies in Classics.

In the late 1990s, Carson's teaching career hit a hurdle when McGill cancelled all graduate courses in ancient Greek, closed its Classics Department, and moved all remaining Classics courses to its History Department. While continuing to teach at McGill as associate professor, Carson dealt with this by spending half of each year as a guest lecturer at other institutions, including the University of Michigan (Norman Freehling Visiting Professorship, 1999–2000), the University of California, Berkeley (Spring 2000), and the California College of Arts and Crafts in Oakland (Spring 2001). She was appointed John MacNaughton Professor of Classics at McGill in 2000.

Carson moved to Ann Arbor and the University of Michigan in 2003, where she served as Professor of Classical Studies, Comparative Literature, and English Language and Literature until 2009. In 2004, Carson was in contention for the Professor of Poetry Chair at the University of Oxford, placing second behind the eventual appointment Christopher Ricks, with around 30 nominations. She was cited as a potential contender for the four-year position again in 2009.

Carson joined the New York University Creative Writing Program as Distinguished Poet-in-Residence and Visiting Professor in 2009. Together with her husband and collaborator Robert Currie, she teaches an annual class at NYU on the art of collaboration, called "Egocircus". Carson was an Andrew D. White Professor-at-Large at Cornell University from 2010 to 2016, and the Mohr Visiting Poet at Stanford University (Creative Writing Program) in 2013. She joined Bard College as Visiting Distinguished Writer-in-Residence in 2014, teaching classical studies and the written arts. Carson has described her more diverse role in the latter part of her career as "a visiting [whatever]", and her decades spent teaching ancient Greek as "a total joy".

Personal life 
Carson is known to be reticent about her private life, and discourages autobiographical readings of her writings. Information about her in publications is often limited to the phrase: "Anne Carson was born in Canada and teaches ancient Greek for a living." While not a confessional poet, her work is considered personal. Carson has said that in her work, she uses her life democratically as just one set of facts among others in the world.

Carson's first marriage, during which she used the surname Giacomelli, lasted eight years and ended in 1980. This union, and its aftermath, has been claimed as a source for "Kinds of Water" (collected in Plainwater), and for The Beauty of the Husband. Carson has confirmed that her first husband took her notebooks when they divorced (as happens to the protagonist in The Beauty of the Husband), though later returned them.

Carson's father Robert had Alzheimer's disease. "The Glass Essay" (collected in Glass, Irony, and God), "Very Narrow" (collected in Plainwater), and "Father's Old Blue Cardigan" (collected in Men in the Off Hours) all deal with his mental and physical decline.

Carson's mother Margaret (1913–1997) died during the writing of Men in the Off Hours. Carson closed the collection with the prose piece "Appendix to Ordinary Time", using crossed-out phrases from the diaries and manuscripts of Virginia Woolf to craft an epitaph for her. Red Doc> has been read as a second elegy for the death of her mother. Carson has described her mother as the love of her life.

Carson's brother Michael was arrested for drug dealing in 1978. Jumping bail, he fled Canada and she never saw him again. Carson dealt with the disappearance of her brother from her life in "Water Margins: An Essay on Swimming by My Brother" (collected in Plainwater), which is written as a kind of memoir. In 2000, he called her and they arranged to meet in Copenhagen where he lived, but he died before they could reconnect. Nox, an epitaph Carson created for her brother in 2000 and published in 2010, has been described as her most explicitly personal work.

Carson is married to the artist Robert Currie, whom she met in Ann Arbor while teaching at the University of Michigan. She has described Currie as "my collaborator-husband person". Projects they have worked on together include book designs and performances for Nox and Antigonick. Carson also refers to Currie as "the Randomizer" during their creative process.

On April 19 2022, Anne Patricia Carson and Robert Duncan Currie were granted Icelandic citizenship.

Awards and honours

Winner 
1984: Quarterly Review of Literature Betty Colladay Award for Canicula di Anna
1996: Lannan Literary Award for Poetry
1996: QSPELL Award – A. M. Klein Prize for Poetry for Glass, Irony and God
1997: Pushcart Prize for "Jaget"
1998: QSPELL Award – A. M. Klein Prize for Poetry for Autobiography of Red
2001: Griffin Poetry Prize for Men in the Off Hours (Canadian winner)
2001: T. S. Eliot Prize for The Beauty of the Husband
2001: Los Angeles Times Book Prize for Poetry for The Beauty of the Husband
2001: QWF Award – A. M. Klein Prize for Poetry for The Beauty of the Husband
2010: PEN Award for Poetry in Translation for An Oresteia
2012: Criticos Prize (London Hellenic Prize) for Antigonick
2014: Griffin Poetry Prize for Red Doc> (Canadian winner)
2016: Blue Metropolis International Literary Grand Prize for lifetime achievement
2019: Manuel Acuña International Poetry Prize
2020: Princess of Asturias Award for Literature
2020: Governor General's Literary Award for Norma Jeane Baker of Troy
2021: PEN/Nabokov Award for Achievement in International Literature

Finalist 
1993: QSPELL Award – A. M. Klein Prize for Poetry shortlist for Short Talks
1994: Journey Prize shortlist for "Water Margins"
1998: Forward Prize shortlist for Glass and God
1998: National Book Critics Circle Award Poetry finalist for Autobiography of Red
1999: T. S. Eliot Prize shortlist for Autobiography of Red
2000: T. S. Eliot Prize shortlist for Men in the Off Hours
2000: National Book Critics Circle Award Poetry finalist for Men in the Off Hours
2001: Governor General's Literary Award Poetry finalist for Men in the Off Hours
2002: Lenore Marshall Poetry Prize finalist for The Beauty of the Husband
2010: National Book Critics Circle Award Poetry finalist for Nox
2013: T. S. Eliot Prize shortlist for Red Doc>
2013: The Kitschies Red Tentacle Award (best novel) finalist for Red Doc>
2014: Folio Prize shortlist for Red Doc>
2018: New Academy Prize in Literature longlist
2022: Governor General's Literary Award Poetry finalist for H of H Playbook

Fellowships 
1997: Rockefeller Bellagio Center Fellowship
1998: Guggenheim Fellowship for Poetry
2000: MacArthur Fellowship
2007: Anna-Maria Kellen Fellowship, The American Academy in Berlin
2011: Creative Scotland / Cove Park Muriel Spark Fellowship
2018: Inga Maren Otto Fellowship, The Watermill Center

Academic 
1986–1987: Rockefeller Scholar-in-Residence at the 92nd Street Y (New York)
2012: Honorary degree from the University of Toronto
2014: Honorary degree (Doctor of Letters) from the University of St Andrews

Other 
1999: American Academy of Arts and Sciences International Honorary Member
1999: Modern Library: 100 Best Nonfiction Books (Reader's List) – Eros the Bittersweet
2000: New York Times Notable Books of the Year List – Men in the Off Hours
2005: Member of the Order of Canada
2010: Griffin Poetry Prize Judge
2011: American Academy of Arts and Letters Foreign Honorary Member

Selected bibliography

Writings 
Eros the Bittersweet (1986)
Short Talks (1992)
Glass, Irony, and God (1995) 
Plainwater (1995)
Autobiography of Red (1998)
Economy of the Unlost (1999)
Men in the Off Hours (2000)
The Beauty of the Husband (2001)
Decreation (2005)
Nox (2010) 
Antigonick (2012) 
Red Doc> (2013) 
Nay Rather (2013)
The Albertine Workout (2014)
Float (2016)
Norma Jeane Baker of Troy (2019) 
The Trojan Women: A Comic (2021) 
H of H Playbook (2021)

Translations 
Electra (2001) 
If Not, Winter (2002) 
Grief Lessons (2006) 
An Oresteia (2009) 
Iphigenia Among the Taurians (2014) 
Antigone (2015) 
Bakkhai (2015)

References

External links

 Poetry Foundation biography
 Academy of American Poets biography
 The Canadian Encyclopedia biography
 The Paris Review interview by Will Aitken (2004)
 Brick interview by Eleanor Wachtel (2012)
 Commentary on Antigonick by Judith Butler (2012)
 The Chat with GG's Literature Award Winner Anne Carson 49th Shelf (2021)

1950 births
Living people
20th-century Canadian essayists
20th-century Canadian poets
20th-century Canadian women writers
20th-century essayists
20th-century Canadian translators
21st-century Canadian essayists
21st-century Canadian poets
21st-century Canadian women writers
21st-century Canadian translators
Anglophone Quebec people
Canadian literary critics
Canadian women non-fiction writers
Canadian women poets
Governor General's Award-winning poets
MacArthur Fellows
Academic staff of McGill University
Members of the Order of Canada
Princeton University faculty
Roberta C. Holloway Lecturer in the Practice of Poetry
The New Yorker people
Translators from Greek
Translators of Ancient Greek texts
Translators to English
T. S. Eliot Prize winners
University of Michigan faculty
Women literary critics
Writers from Toronto
University of Toronto alumni
PEN/Nabokov Award winners
Naturalised citizens of Iceland